San Nicola, Italian name of Saint Nicholas, may refer to:

Places of Italy
Municipalities
San Nicola Arcella, in the Province of Cosenza, Calabria
San Nicola Baronia, in the Province of Avellino, Campania
San Nicola da Crissa, in the Province of Vibo Valentia, Calabria
San Nicola dell'Alto, in the Province of Crotone, Calabria
San Nicola la Strada, in the Province of Caserta, Campania
San Nicola Manfredi, in the Province of Benevento, Campania
Sannicola, in the Province of Lecce, Apulia

Hamlets
San Nicola (island), an island and municipal seat of Isole Tremiti (FG), Apulia
San Nicola (Albanella), in the municipality of Albanella (SA), Campania
San Nicola (Centola), in the municipality of Centola (SA), Campania
San Nicola (Fara Filiorum Petri), in the municipality of Fara Filiorum Petri (CH), Abruzzo
San Nicola di Melfi, in the municipality of Melfi (PZ), Basilicata

Architectures
Stadio San Nicola, a stadium in Bari, Italy
List of St. Nicholas Churches in Italy

See also

San Nicolás (disambiguation)
Saint Nicholas (disambiguation)
San Nicolò (disambiguation)